Mardwal is a village in union council of Naushera Tehsil, Khushab District, Punjab Province, Pakistan.

Location
Mardwal is located 205 kilometers from Islamabad and situated in Wadi-e-Soon Sakesar, five kilometers north of Naushera Tehsil Headquarters on Naushera-Rawalpindi road.

References

External links
https://web.archive.org/web/20140108172305/http://khushab.gop.pk/html/About_District.html#About_District_Intro
https://web.archive.org/web/20150819090612/http://svnp.khushab.gop.pk/

Populated places in Khushab District